Solone Raion was a raion (district) of Dnipropetrovsk Oblast, southeastern-central Ukraine. Its administrative centre was located at the urban-type settlement of Solone. The raion was abolished on 18 July 2020 as part of the administrative reform of Ukraine, which reduced the number of raions of Dnipropetrovsk Oblast to seven. The area of Solone Raion was merged into Dnipro Raion.

At the time of disestablishment, the raion consisted of three hromadas:
 Novopokrovka settlement hromada with the administration in the urban-type settlement of Novopokrovka;
 Solone settlement hromada with the administration in Solone;
 Sviatovasylivka settlement hromada with the administration in the settlement of Sviatovasylivka.

References

Former raions of Dnipropetrovsk Oblast
1923 establishments in Ukraine
Ukrainian raions abolished during the 2020 administrative reform